This is a complete list of episodes from the anime series Digimon Data Squad.   As it currently stands, Digimon Data Squad is the shortest series in the franchise to date, and ends with 48 episodes. The series ran in Japan on Fuji TV from April 2006 to March 2007, and in the United States on Jetix from October 2007 to November 2008.

This series uses two opening themes in the original Japanese version. "Gou-ing! Going! My Soul!" is used as the opening theme of the first half and the second opening song, "Hirari", is used in the remaining episodes.


Episode list

Volume DVDs

North American Release
New Video Group released a complete DVD box set release on March 11, 2014. Like previous releases, it is an 8-disc, English dub collection.

Notes
 Starting from episode 30, a new opening sequence is used. This is the first time, in any Digimon series, that a second, completely different, opening sequence is used. The second opening features the DATS in their new attire, the Digivice Burst using the Air Signal, Ikuto and Falcomon, the Royal Knights, Masaru's father, BanchoLeomon, Masaru's dogtag enlarged, and heavily features the Mega leveled Digimon in action.

References

Digimon Data Squad
2006 Japanese television seasons
2007 Japanese television seasons
Data Squad